The 2021 Chengdu Hunters season was be the third season of Chengdu Hunters's existence in the Overwatch League and the team's second season under head coach Wang "RUI" Xingrui, after he was the head coach of the team in 2019. The team qualified for three of the four midseason tournaments, reaching the finals twice, but failed to secure a title in any of them. For the first time in franchise history, the team qualified for the season playoffs. However, a loss to the San Francisco Shock in the lower bracket ended their playoff run. Damage player Huang "Leave" Xin won the season's Most Valuable Player award.

Preceding offseason

Organizational changes 
In mid-September 2020, the Hunters released assistant coach Guan "Garry" Li and co-head coaches Murong "Chen" Chen and Chang "Ray" Chia-Hua. The team signed Wang "RUI" Xingrui as their new head coach. Wang was previously the team's head coach in the 2019 season, before he left the team due to health issues.

Roster changes 
The Hunters entered free agency with three free agents, all of which became free agents due to the Hunters not exercising the option to retain the player for another year.

Acquisitions 
The Hunters' first offseason acquisitions were Lei "Jimmy" Yujia, a rookie damage player coming from Guangzhou Charge Overwatch Contenders academy team Ultra Prime Academy, and Lui "Kaneki" Nian, a rookie damage player who most recently played for Team Cat in Contenders, both of whom signed on November 19. Three days later, they signed Tan "Nisha" Li, a rookie support player who formerly played for Contenders team Bilibili Gaming. The Hunters signed two more rookie players on November 27: tank player Qui "GA9A" Jiaxin and support player Cao "Faraway1987" Jiale, both of whom came from Shanghai Dragons' academy team Team CC. The Hunters' final acquisition of the offseason was Zhou "Mmonk" Xiang, a rookie support player promoted from their academy team Team Chaser on March 25, 2021.

Departures 
The Hunters' first departure was on October 15, 2020, with the release of damage player Lo "Baconjack" Tzu-heng and tank player Chen "Ating" Shao-hua. None of the Hunters' three free agents returned, all of which signed with other teams, beginning with support players Kong "Kyo" Chunting and Chen "Lengsa" Jinyi, both of whom were sent to the Hunters' academy team Team Chaser on November 17. One week later, support player He "Molly" Chengzhi was signed by the Shanghai Dragons.

Regular season 
The Hunters began their 2021 season on April 17 with a win over the Los Angeles Valiant 3–1 in the May Melee qualifiers. Chengdu finished the qualifiers with a 3–1 record and advanced to the regional knockouts. After defeating the Seoul Dynasty in the knockouts, the Hunters advanced to the interregional tournament bracket. The team's first match in the double-elimination tournament was against the Dallas Fuel; they lost the match, 1–3, sending them to the lower bracket. In the first round of the lower bracket, Chengdu lost to the Florida Mayhem, 1–3, eliminating them from the tournament.

The Hunters performed poorly in the second tournament cycle, dropping in the regular season standings to fifth out of eighth place in the Eastern Division. Prior the beginning of the third midseason tournament qualifiers, the Summer Showdown, the Hunters sent damage player Liu "Kaneki" Nian back down to their academy team Team Chaser. In his replacement, Chengdu promoted damage player Zhong "TAROCOOK1E" Yunlong from Team Chaser. After the first week of the Summer Showdown qualifiers, tank player Luo "Elsa" Wenjie, who had been with the team since their inception, retired. The team advanced past the qualifiers and regional knockouts, giving them their second tournament appearance of the season. In the first round, on July 15, the Hunters defeated the Dallas Fuel, 3–1. After a loss to the Shanghai Dragons and win over the Dallas Fuel, again, the Hunters advanced to the tournament finals, where they again faced the Dragons. Despite winning the first map of the series, the Hunters lost the following four, losing the finals match 1–4.

In the final midseason tournament cycle of the season, the Countdown Cup, the Hunters again advanced past the qualifiers and regional knockouts, securing their third tournament appearance. The team once again made it to the finals, for the second consecutive time, where they faced the Los Angeles Gladiators. After a seven-map series, the Hunters lost the match by a 3–4 scoreline. The team finished the regular season with 11 wins, 5 losses, 15 league points, and the third seed in the season playoffs.

Damage player Huang "Leave" Xin won the was awarded a Role Star commendation and named season's Most Valuable Player.

Playoffs 

In the first round of the 2021 season playoffs, the Hunters faced the fifth-seeded Atlanta Reign; Chengdu won the match 3–2. However, the following day, the Hunters lost against the Dallas Fuel by a 0–3 scoreline, sending them to the lower bracket. Facing elimination, the Hunters faced the San Francisco Shock the following day; the Hunters lost in a five-map series, 2–3, ending their playoff run.

Final roster

Transactions 
Transactions of/for players on the roster during the 2021 regular season:
On June 17, Hunters released damage player Liu "Kaneki" Nian and signed damage player Zhong "TAROCOOK1E" Yunlong.
On July 1, tank player Luo "Elsa" Wenjie retired.

Standings

Game log

Regular season 

|2021 season schedule

Postseason

References 

Chengdu Hunters
Chengdu Hunters
Chengdu Hunters seasons